Shih-Chun Wang (1910-1993) was a Chinese-American medical doctor, neuroscientist, and pharmacology professor.

Early life and education
Wang was born on January 25, 1910, in Tientsin, China. He attended Yenching University in Beijing where he received a bachelor of science in 1931 before going to Peking Union Medical College to earn his medical degree in 1935. In 1937, Wang received a Rockefeller Foundation fellowship to travel to the United States to study neurology at Northwestern University in Evanston, Illinois. He worked under the direction of S.W. Ransom at the Institute of Neurology in the Northwestern University Medical School where he received his Ph.D. in 1940. While still a student at Northwestern, Wang married the former Mamie Kwoh, a registered nurse from China.

Career
From 1941 until 1956 he was a member of Columbia University's Department of Physiology, and after that he joined its Department of Pharmacology. He was the first person to be its Gustavus A. Pfeiffer Professor of Pharmacology, and he retired in 1978. Wang was elected a member of Academia Sinica in 1958.

His research into motion sickness led to the creation of drugs to prevent problems such as vomiting. He studied nausea in astronauts for NASA, which helped lead to the creation of the vomit comet.

Surgeon Commander Christopher J. Davis OBE of the Royal Navy wrote in 1995, "Shih-Chun Wang who, in conjunction with Herbert Borison in 1950, had published the last major development in ideas concerning the mechanism of vomiting control."

Later life
After moving to New York City, Wang's wife Mamie taught nursing courses at the Cornell School of Nursing and helped develop the training program for nurse practitioners. Shih-Chun and Mamie had two daughters. One daughter, Phyllis Wise, followed in her parents’ footsteps and went on to become a medical research scientist, and later became a university administrator who led several large universities. Wang died on June 6, 1993, in a hospital in Englewood, New Jersey.

Awards and honors
In 1951 he received a Guggenheim Fellowship.

Wang also received the Sigma Xi Award at Northwestern University, a Commonwealth Foundation Fellowship, and an American Chinese Medical Society Scientific Achievement Award. He was elected a member of Academic Sinica and was an honorary member of the Chinese Pharmacological Society.

Selected publications

References

1910 births
1993 deaths
American academics of Chinese descent
American neuroscientists
Chinese emigrants to the United States
Chinese neuroscientists
Northwestern University alumni
Biologists from Tianjin
Columbia University faculty
Educators from Tianjin
Yenching University alumni
Members of Academia Sinica